Ortwin Sam Schneider-Freyermuth (born November 1958) is a German American video game executive, entertainment lawyer and film producer. He currently holds the position of co-founder (together with Chris Roberts), vice-chairman and general counsel of Cloud Imperium Games. He is also known for having been the CEO of film production company Capella Films and for producing the 1997 director's cut version of Wolfgang Petersen's Das Boot.

Biography
Ortwin Freyermuth studied law at the University of Göttingen and at the University of California, Los Angeles, where he completed his Master degree with a thesis on film distribution and copyright law in 1986. In the early 1990s, he was part of a group of German film producers who pioneered a new business model, acquiring the production and distribution rights for several Hollywood films with both financial and popular success. After having previously served as a legal advisor to Chris Roberts' Ascendant Pictures and other production companies, he founded Cloud Imperium Games with Roberts in April 2012 to create the video game Star Citizen.

Freyermuth is the brother of German journalist and author Gundolf S. Freyermuth.

Academic works

Filmography

Producer
 1991: Shattered (co-producer)
 1991: The Nutt House (executive producer)
 1993: The Real McCoy (executive producer)
 1993: Carlito's Way (executive producer)
 1994: Body Shot (executive producer)
 1997: Das Boot (producer – director's cut)
 2011: The Ledge (executive producer)

Legal services
 1988: Burning Secret (special consultant)
 1990: The NeverEnding Story II: The Next Chapter (production executive)
 2003: 11:14 (additional legal services)
 2003: Monster (legal services – as Ortwin Freyermuth Esq.)
 2005: Havoc (legal services)
 2005: Lord of War (legal advisor: Ascendant Pictures)
 2006: Ask the Dust (legal services: Freyermuth & Associates)
 2006: Lucky Number Slevin (legal services: Freyermuth & Associates, Inc. – as Ortwin Freyermuth Esq.)
 2013: 2 Guns (financing legal services: Freyermuth & Associates, Inc. for Foresight Unlimited – as Ortwin Freyermuth Esq.)

References

External links
 
 "How indie film financing could shape the future of games" by Ortwin Freyermuth

American film producers
California lawyers
Entertainment lawyers
German film producers
UCLA School of Law alumni
American chief executives
Living people
1958 births
German emigrants to the United States